Estradiol furoate (EF), or estradiol 17β-furoate, sold under the brand name Di-Folliculine, is an estrogen medication and estrogen ester which is no longer marketed. It is the C17β furoate ester of estradiol. Estradiol benzoate has also been marketed under the brand name Di-Folliculine, and should not be confused with estradiol furoate.

The duration of action of the related estradiol ester estradiol 3-furoate by intramuscular injection was studied in women in 1952. Its duration in oil solution was found to be similar to that of estradiol benzoate in oil solution and shorter than that of estradiol dipropionate in oil solution.

See also
 List of estrogen esters § Estradiol esters

References

Abandoned drugs
Estradiol esters
Furoate esters
Synthetic estrogens
2-Furyl compounds